The Navy Pay Office also known as the Navy Treasury  was established in 1546. The office was administered by the Treasurer of the Navy, and was semi-autonomous of the Navy Office. It existed until 1835 when all offices and accounting departments of the Royal Navy were unified into the Department of the Accountant-General of the Navy. The Navy Pay Office received money directly from HM Treasury.

History
The Navy Pay Office (NPO) was established in 1546, it was administered by the Treasurer of the Navy and existed until 1835 when all finance and accounting offices and departments of the Royal Navy were centralized into a single department under the Accountant-General of the Navy. The office was responsible processing naval finance including payments to flag officers, other commissioned officers and non-commissioned naval personnel and including the Victualling Office. The work of its staff was divided into a number of branches with specific areas of responsibility, these were overseen by the paymaster of the navy, the inspector of seamen's wills and the captains comptrolling payments of ships at Portsmouth, Plymouth and the Nore.

The Navy Pay Office (domain of the Treasurer of the Navy and the Paymaster of the Navy) was independent of the Navy Board; though the board's commissioners were required to authorize payments, all funds transferred from HM Treasury were held and issued by the Navy Pay Office (which was also known as the Naval Treasury).

Organisation and structure of the Navy Pay Office

The Navy Pay Office consisted of a number of specific departments and offices that included:

Branches
Each branch within the Navy Pay Office was administered by a Chief Clerk each had a head cashier together with other supporting staff.

 Accountants Branch
 Allotment Branch
 Bill and Remittance Branch
 Navy Branch
 Navy Bills Branch
 Prize Branch
 Stores Branch
 Ticket Branch
 Ticket and Wages Branch
 Treasurers Branch
 Victualling Branch
 Wages Branch
 Wills Branch

Offices
 Office of the Assistant to the Treasurer of the Navy
 Office of the Captains Controlling the Payment of Ships
 Office of the Paymaster of the Marines (Navy Board)
 Office of the Paymaster of the Navy
 Office of the Inspector of Seaman's Wills

Citations

Sources
 Archives, National (1563–1985). "Records of Accounting and Pay Departments". nationalarchives.gov.uk. London, England: The National Archives. Retrieved 2 January 2019.
 Glasgow Tom. jun. (1970) Maturing of Naval Administration 1556–1564, The Mariner's Mirror, 56:1, 3-26, DOI: 10.1080/00253359.1970.10658511
 Great Britain, Admiralty (December 1814). "Admiralty Office". The Navy List. London, England: John Murray.
 Great Britain, Admiralty (March 1828). "Civil Departments of the Navy". The Navy List. London, England: John Murray. 
 Great Britain, Admiralty (April 1834). "Civil Departments of the Navy". The Navy List. London, England: John Murray.
 'Paymaster of Marines 1831-2 ', in Office-Holders in Modern Britain: Volume 7, Navy Board Officials 1660–1832, ed. J M Collinge (London, 1978), p. 33. British History Online http://www.british-history.ac.uk/office-holders/vol7/p33 [accessed 2 January 2019].

Admiralty departments
Navy Office organisations